Cyrtopodion baigii is a species of gecko, a lizard in the family Gekkonidae. The species is endemic to Pakistan.

Etymology
The specific name, baigii, is in honor of Pakistani herpetologist Khalid Javed Baig (1956–2006).

Geographic range
C. baigii is found in norther Pakistan, in Astore District, Gilgit-Baltistan territory.

Reproduction
C. baigii is oviparous.

References

Further reading
Masroor, Rafaqat (2008). "A new species of Cyrtopodion (Sauria: Gekkonidae) from the northern areas of Pakistan". Zootaxa 1857: 33–43. (Cyrtopodion baigii, new species).

Cyrtopodion
Reptiles described in 2008